Erythrobacter ramosus is a species of bacterium.

Description
It is an obligately aerobic, bacteriochlorophyll a-containing bacteria.

References

Further reading
Whitman, William B., et al., eds. Bergey's manual of systematic bacteriology. Vol. 2. Springer, 2012.
Yurkov, Vladimir, Jocelyne Jappe, and Andre Vermeglio. "Tellurite resistance and reduction by obligately aerobic photosynthetic bacteria." Applied and Environmental Microbiology 62.11 (1996): 4195–4198.
Yurkov, V. "Gad’on N, Angerhofer A, Drews G (1994) Light harvesting complexes of aerobic bacteriochlorophyll-containing bacteria Roseococcus thiosulfatophilus, RB3 and Erythromicrobium ramosum, E5 and the transfer of excitation energy from carotenoids to bacteriochlorophyll." Z Naturforsch 49: 579–586.

External links

LPSN
Type strain of Erythromicrobium ramosum at BacDive -  the Bacterial Diversity Metadatabase

Sphingomonadales
Bacteria described in 1994